Pleasant Gardens is an unincorporated community in Washington Township, Putnam County, in the U.S. state of Indiana.

History
Pleasant Gardens was laid out in 1830.

Geography

References

Unincorporated communities in Putnam County, Indiana
Unincorporated communities in Indiana